is a Japanese art historian. He currently works in the University of Tokyo. He was born in Hamamatsu, Shizuoka Prefecture and graduated from the Tokyo National University of Fine Arts and Music. He took part in publishing the book The History of Japanese Photography as an essayist along with Kōtarō Iizawa. He is also known for his research of Nishiki-e such as Yoarashi Okinu.

In 2010, Kinoshita praised Kengo Kuma for his decision in which a part of old structures of kabuki-za would remain in the new institution.

Books
 (2007, Chikuma Shobō)

References

1954 births
Living people
Japanese art historians
People from Hamamatsu
Recipients of the Medal with Purple Ribbon